Jean-François Jarjavay (25 April 1815 – 22 April 1868) was a French anatomist and surgeon who was a native of Savignac-les-Églises in the department of Dordogne. He practised medicine at the Hôpital Lourcine and Hôpital Beaujon in Paris, and in 1859 became a professor of anatomy.

In 1867 Jarjavay provided the first description of the morbid processes associated with subacromial bursitis, a disorder also known as subacromial impingement syndrome. His name is lent to "Jarjavay's ligament", which is a fold of peritoneum that is also known as a sacrouterine fold, and "Jarjavay's muscle", which is a structure arising from the ramus of the ischium and inserted into the constrictor muscle of the vagina.

Written works 
Among his written works is an 1856 book on the urethra titled Recherches anatomiques sur l’urèthre de l’homme. Other noted works are as follows:
 Propositions d'anatomie, de physiologie et de chirurgie (1846)
 De l'influence des efforts sur la production des maladies chirurgicales (1847)
 Mémoire sur les fongus du testicule (1849)
 Des fractures des articulations (1851)
 Traité d'anatomie chirurgicale (1852–54).

References 
 Dorlands Medical Dictionary (definition of eponyms)

French surgeons
French anatomists
1815 births
1868 deaths
People from Dordogne